The 1980 NCAA Division I Men's Cross Country Championships were the 42nd annual cross country meet to determine the team and individual national champions of NCAA Division I men's collegiate cross country running in the United States. Held on November 24, 1980, the meet was hosted by Wichita State University at the Echo Hills Golf Course in Park City, Kansas. The distance for this race was 10 kilometers (6.21 miles).

This was the final year of a singular men's championship. Starting in 1981, the NCAA Women's Division I Cross Country Championship was added and held at the same site as the men's championship each subsequent year.

All Division I cross country teams were eligible to qualify for the meet through their placement at various regional qualifying meets. In total, 29 teams and 243 individual runners contested this championship.

The team national championship was retained again by the UTEP Miners, their sixth, and third consecutive, overall title. The individual championship was won by Suleiman Nyambui, also from UTEP, with a time of 20:04.00.

Men's title
Distance: 10,000 meters (6.21 miles)

Team Result (Top 10)

Individual Result (Top 10)

See also
NCAA Men's Division II Cross Country Championship 
NCAA Men's Division III Cross Country Championship

References

NCAA Cross Country Championships
NCAA Division I Cross Country Championships
NCAA Division I Cross Country Championships
NCAA Division I Cross Country Championships
Park City, Kansas
Track and field in Kansas
Wichita State University